Vahap Özaltay or Vehâb Özaltay (born, Beşir oğlu Vahap; in 1907, 1908 or 1909 – 10 June 1965) was a Turkish international footballer and track and field athlete.

He is most notably for his service at Altay S.K., being the first professional football player in Turkey and being the first Turkish player to ever play for a foreign club. He chose his last name based on his love for Altay (lit. "Pure/Real Altay").

Özaltay was born in 1908 in Beirut.  He was the son of a civil servant.  When he was 10 years old, his family moved to Aydın.  Shortly after the Greek Occupation of İzmir on 21 May 1919, his family moved to Kastamonu. He started his football career in Kastamonu.

Career

Club career
After the Greek presence ended on 8 September 1922, his family moved to İzmir. He was 14 years old when he started playing for Altay.  He started playing in the main squad for Altay beginning in 1922.  Altay was the leading Turkish football Club in Izmir.  He won Izmir League with Altay on 5 occasions (1923–24, 1924–25, 1927–28, 1928–29, 1930–31).

Özaltay was transferred to the French club Racing Club de Paris in 1932, becoming the first Turkish player to do so. He played in France for 5 seasons for Racing Club. Due to his head-made goals, he was nicknamed "Le Tête de Turc" in France.

In 1937 he returned to Turkey and played for Altay again.  This time he played for Altay as a professional football player.  He is the first Turkish player given a professional football player certificate by the Turkish State.

International career
Özaltay represented Turkey at senior level once, against Bulgaria in a friendly game, held at Taksim Stadium, Istanbul, on 4 November 1932, ended 3–2 for Bulgaria.

Coaching career
After his football career, he worked as a manager for Altay and for the national team of the military. He became famous as being the first manager to use the WM formation. With the national team he won the World Army Football tournament of 1954.

Personal life
Özaltay was married with 7 children. His younger brother, Saim, also played for Altay S.K. Although the rivalry between their clubs, Özaltay and Said Altınordu, Altınordu F.K. icon were best friends. Özaltay died due to a heart attack following his given speech at generalassembly of Altay S.K., on 10 June 1965.

References
 Citations

 Books

External links
 Profile at TFF

1900s births
1965 deaths
Turkish people of African descent
Turkish footballers
Turkish expatriate footballers
Turkish football managers
Altay S.K. footballers
Racing Club de France Football players
Ligue 1 players
Turkey international footballers
Association football midfielders